The men's curling tournament took place at the Vancouver Olympic/Paralympic Centre. The draws took place between 16 and 25 February 2010 and the final took place on 27 February 2010.  The preliminary round was a round-robin tournament between all 10 teams; the top four qualified for the medal round.

Teams
The teams are listed as follows:

*Throws third rocks
**Throws second rocks

Standings

Results

Draws

Draw 1
Tuesday, February 16, 9:00 AM

Draw 2
Tuesday, February 16, 7:00 PM

Draw 3
Wednesday, February 17, 2:00 PM

Draw 4
Thursday, February 18, 9:00 AM

Draw 5
Thursday, February 18, 7:00 PM

Draw 6
Friday, February 19, 2:00 PM

Draw 7
Saturday, February 20, 9:00 AM

Draw 8
Saturday, February 20, 7:00 PM

Draw 9
Sunday, February 21, 2:00 PM

Draw 10
Monday, February 22, 9:00 AM

Draw 11
Monday, February 22, 7:00 PM

Draw 12
Tuesday, February 23, 2:00 PM

Tiebreaker
Wednesday, February 24, 2:00 PM

Medal round

Semi-finals

Thursday, February 25, 2:00 PM

* - rock picked up debris

Bronze medal final
Saturday, February 27, 9:00 AM

* - rock picked up debris

Gold medal final
Saturday, February 27, 3:00 PM

See also 
 Curling at the 2010 Winter Olympics

References

External links 
 https://www.olympic.org/vancouver-2010/curling/curling-men

Men's tournament
Men's tournament
Men's events at the 2010 Winter Olympics